Unneberg is a residential- and statistical area (grunnkrets) in Sandefjord municipality, Norway. The statistical area Unneberg, which also can include the peripheral parts of the village as well as the surrounding countryside, has a population of 552. From being primarily an agricultural area throughout the 1950s and early 1960s, Unneberg changed drastically in the late 1960s and early 1970s. It is now home to small neighborhoods, grocery stores, and playgrounds.

Unneberg is located between Gokstad to the south and Råstad to the north. It is considered a part of the urban settlement Sandefjord, which covers the greater Sandefjord city area and stretches towards Stokke and into peripheral parts of Larvik municipality. The urban settlement Sandefjord has a population of 39,849, of which 39,144 people live within Sandefjord.

The street names at Unneberg are named for plant species, including Common hyacinth (Svibelveien), Anemone (Anemoneveien), Crocus (Krokusveien), Common Snowdrop (Sneklokkeveien), Tulip (Tuplianveien), Lily (Liljeveien), and others.

References

Villages in Vestfold og Telemark